Eva Nova (1916–1996) was an Italian actress and singer. She appeared in leading roles in several films during the late 1940s and early 1950s.

Filmography
 The Holy Nun (1949)
 Le due madonne (1949)
 Destiny (1951)
 Repentance (1952)
 Milanese in Naples (1954)
 Madonna delle rose (1954)
 Incatenata dal destino (1956)

References

Bibliography 
 Marlow-Mann, Alex. The New Neapolitan Cinema. Edinburgh University Press, 2011.
Morreale, Emiliano. Così piangevano: il cinema melò nell'Italia degli anni Cinquanta. Donzelli Editore, 2011.

External links 
 

1916 births
1996 deaths
Italian film actresses
20th-century Italian women singers
Musicians from Naples
Actresses from Naples